George Barnes may refer to:

Politics
George Barnes (Georgia politician) (1833–1901), United States Representative from the state of Georgia
George Barnes (Australian politician) (1856–1949), Queensland businessman and politician, MLA for Warwick
George Barnes (British politician) (1859–1940), Scottish politician, Leader of the Labour Party
George F. Barnes (1919–2004), American politician in the Virginia state senate

Sports
George Barnes (sport shooter) (1849–1934), British Olympic sport shooter
George Barnes (footballer, born 1876) (1876–1946), English footballer
George Arthur Barnes (1883–1919), English racing motorcyclist and pioneer aviator
George Barnes (footballer, born 1899) (1899–1961), English footballer
George Barnes (boxer) (1927–2000), Australian boxer of the 1940s, '50s and '60s
George Barnes (wrestler), Australian actor and professional wrestler

Other
George Barnes (priest) (1782–1847), Archdeacon of Barnstaple
George Barnes (cinematographer) (1892–1953), American cinematographer
Machine Gun Kelly (1895–1954), American gangster, born George Kelly Barnes
Sir George Barnes (BBC controller) (1904–1960), British television and radio producer and executive
George Barnes (musician) (1921–1977), American jazz guitarist